Kirkstall is a ward in the metropolitan borough of the City of Leeds, West Yorkshire, England.  It contains 48 listed buildings that are recorded in the National Heritage List for England.  Of these, one is listed at Grade I, the highest of the three grades, two are at Grade II*, the middle grade, and the others are at Grade II, the lowest grade.  The ward contains Kirkstall, Burley and Hawksworth, all suburbs of Leeds.  The River Aire and the Leeds and Liverpool Canal pass through the ward, and the listed buildings associated with these are weirs, sluices, locks, and a canal bridge.  The most important building is the ward is Kirkstall Abbey, which is listed, together with associated structures.  The other listed buildings include houses and associated structures, churches and items in churchyards, public houses, a school and a former Sunday school, a commemorative arch, road bridges, a railway viaduct and station, former mill buildings, buildings associated with a former forge, and a war memorial.


Key

Buildings

References

Citations

Sources

 

Lists of listed buildings in West Yorkshire